Julian Illingworth (born January 30, 1984) is a retired American professional squash player.

Illingworth first made an impression on the American junior circuit in 1998-1999 when he finished third in the country for boys under 16. Illingworth attended Yale University when his age was 18. He was a 4 time All-American selection and 4 time All-Ivy selection on the squash team.  He also won 2 national individual titles during his junior and senior years at Yale.

After Illingworth graduated from college in 2006, he played professionally for 8 years. He became the highest-ranked American male player of all-time after reaching no. 24 in the world. He is a record 9-time U.S. national champion, with 8 successive titles from 2005 to 2012. He was the inaugural US Pro Squash Series champion for the 2012-13 season. Illingworth retired from playing full-time on the PSA World Tour in 2014 and made his last appearance on the tour in March 2017.

References

External links 
 
 

1984 births
Living people
American male squash players
Yale Bulldogs men's squash players
Squash players at the 2007 Pan American Games
Squash players at the 2011 Pan American Games
Pan American Games silver medalists for the United States
Pan American Games bronze medalists for the United States
Pan American Games medalists in squash
Competitors at the 2013 World Games
Medalists at the 2011 Pan American Games